Michael Vink (born 22 November 1991) is a New Zealand professional road cyclist, who currently rides for UCI WorldTeam .

Vink has won the Tour of Southland three times (2018, 2019, 2021), a feat only achieved by four other riders. He said of his third win “I think we were the hot favourites from day one and to finish it off for me and for all the boys and the sponsors, it’s the best way to repay them, by taking the win,” He has also won Le Race (Christchurch to Akaroa) three times (2010, 2013 and 2021) and holds the course record. He said of his 2021 victory “Conditions were pretty good, and the record was on the cards, so I really pushed hard to get the record,”

Vink, said of joining UAE Team Emirates, at the age of 31  “I’m a guy who just loves riding my bike. I would wake up, check the weather forecast, see how I felt, and then do what I wanted. I was working on and off, a few different things all cycling-related, including in shops. I’ve got too much experience in the cycling industry to do something different.”

Major results
Source:

2008
 1st  Time trial, National Junior Road Championships
 1st Overall Yunca Junior Tour of Southland
 3rd Team pursuit, UCI Juniors World Championships
2009
 1st  Time trial, National Junior Road Championships
 National Junior Track Championships
1st  Individual pursuit (national record)
1st  Team pursuit (national record)
 1st Overall Yunca Junior Tour of Southland
 1st Graperide
 1st French Under 19 selection race
 1st Time trial, Te Awamutu Junior Tour
 1st Time trial, Rotorua Junior Tour
 Most aggressive rider, Grand prix Leclerc de Lune à Cholet
 2nd Overall Vendée les 3 Rivières
1st Junior rider classification
 3rd Team pursuit, Australian Youth Olympic Festival
 9th Overall Tour of Southland
2010
 1st  Time trial, National Under-23 Road Championships
 1st Overall Main Divide Cycle Race
1st Mountains classification
 1st  Overall Monmort Chouilly Beaunay
 1st Le Race (course record)
 1st Ottergem Kermesse
 1st Christchurch to Hanmer (course record)
 1st Christchurch Time Trial Association 16 km (course record)
 2nd Gore–Invercargill
 3rd Amateur race, Zierikzee
 3rd Long Bays Classic
2011
 National Under-23 Road Championships
1st  Road race
2nd Time trial
 1st Overall Tour de Taieri
 3rd Le Race
2012
 National Road Championships
1st  Road race
1st  Under-23 road race (1st overall and course record)
1st  Under-23 time trial
 1st  Overall Tour de Vineyards
1st  Young rider classification
1st Stage 2
 1st Meulebeke Kermesse
 1st  Mountains classification Triptyque Ardennais
 2nd Overall Tour de Côte-d'Or
1st  Young rider classification
1st Stage 2 (TTT)
 2nd Road race, Christchurch Festival of Cycling
 3rd Overall Tour of Southland
1st  Young rider classification
1st Stage 7 (ITT)
 5th Overall New Zealand Cycle Classic
2013
 National Under-23 Road Championships
1st  Road race
2nd Time trial
 1st Memorial Van Coningsloo
 1st Main Divide Cycle Race
 1st Le Race (course record)
 National Track Championships
2nd Individual pursuit
3rd Team pursuit
3rd Scratch
 4th Overall Tour of the Murray River
 5th Overall Thüringen Rundfahrt der U23
2014
 1st  Overall New Zealand Cycle Classic
1st Stage 1 (ITT)
 1st Graperide
 1st Benchmark Homes Elite Cycling Series
2015
 1st  Time trial, National Road Championships
2016
 2nd Overall Tour of Southland
1st Prologue (TTT), Stages 4 & 6 (ITT)
 2nd La Route Bretonne
 7th Overall New Zealand Cycle Classic
2017
 1st Ronde du Porhoët
 2nd Overall Tour of Southland
1st Stage 6 (ITT)
2018
 1st  Overall Tour of Southland
1st Stage 3
 1st Overall The Pioneer MTB Stage Race (with Tim Rush)
1st Prologue, Stages 2, 3, 4 & 5
 1st Graperide
 2nd Time trial, National Road Championships
 2nd Overall Tour of Tasmania
1st Stage 2
 4th Overall New Zealand Cycle Classic
2019
 1st  Overall Tour of Southland
1st Prologue (TTT)
 1st Overall The Pioneer MTB Stage Race (with Tim Rush)
1st Stages 1, 3, 4 & 5
 2nd Overall Tour de Ijen
 3rd Overall PRUride Philippines
 5th Overall Tour of Taihu Lake
 5th Overall Tour of Fuzhou
 8th Overall Tour de Kumano
2020
 2nd Overall Tour of Southland
2021
 1st  Overall Tour of Southland
1st Stages 2 & 7 (ITT, course record)
 1st Le Race (course record)
 National Road Championships
3rd Time trial
4th Road race
 6th Overall New Zealand Cycle Classic
2022
 2nd Time trial, National Road Championships

References

External links 

Living people
New Zealand male cyclists
1991 births
Cyclists from Christchurch
21st-century New Zealand people